The women's 1000 metres race of the 2013–14 ISU Speed Skating World Cup 4, arranged in Sportforum Hohenschönhausen, in Berlin, Germany, was held on 8 December 2013.

Heather Richardson of the United States won the race, while her compatriot Brittany Bowe came second, and Olga Fatkulina of Russia came third. Antoinette de Jong of the Netherlands won the Division B race.

Results
The race took place on Sunday, 8 December, with Division B scheduled in the morning session, at 10:03, and Division A scheduled in the afternoon session, at 14:32.

Division A

Division B

References

Women 1000
4